Novo Lagovo is a village in Municipality of Prilep, North Macedonia. Established in 1912.

Demographics
As of the 2021 census, Novo Lagovo had 224 residents with the following ethnic composition:
Macedonians 207
Persons for whom data are taken from administrative sources 8
Others 5
Serbs 4

According to the 2002 census, the village had a total of 213 inhabitants. Ethnic groups in the village include:
Macedonians 207
Serbs 4
Others 2

References

Villages in Prilep Municipality